Asian Highway 141 is a highway that is part of Asian Highway Network. It was never signposted in Malaysia, although it is part of Asian Highway Network. It consists of New North Klang Straits Bypass , New Klang Valley Expressway, Duta–Ulu Klang Expressway (Jalan Duta–Sentul Pasar and Sentul Pasar–Greenwood), Kuala Lumpur Middle Ring Road 2 Federal Route 28(Greenwood–Gombak North Interchange), Kuala Lumpur–Karak Expressway, East Coast Expressway (Karak–Jabur) and Gebeng Bypass Federal Route 101.

References

Asian Highway Network